Guillaume Fabre Nicolas Geffrard (23 September 1806 – 31 December 1878) was a mulatto general in the Haitian army and President of Haiti from 1859 until his deposition in 1867.  On 18 April 1852, Faustin Soulouque made him Duke of Tabara. After collaborating in a coup to remove Faustin Soulouque from power in order to return Haiti to the social and political control of the colored elite, Geffrard was made president in 1859. To placate the peasants he renewed the practice of selling state-owned lands and ended a schism with the Roman Catholic Church which then took on an important role in improving education. After surviving several rebellions, he was overthrown by Major Sylvain Salnave in 1867.

Life prior to presidency
Geffrard was a son of Nicolas Geffrard, a general of the Armee indigene during the Haitian Revolution and a signatory of the Haitian Declaration of Independence who was assassinated a few months before Fabre's birth. Fabre Geffrard is then adopted by his uncle, Colonel Fabre. Geffrard left the college in the town of Cayes in 1821 and enlisted in the army. When General Charles Rivière-Hérard launched a rebellion against dictator Jean-Pierre Boyer in 1843, Geffrard joined him and was appointed lieutenant-colonel. He is then sent to the town of Jérémie where he defeated Boyer's troops, who he then pursued as far as the Tiburon peninsula. After this military triumph he was elevated to the rank of brigadier general in 1844. The new president, Jean-Baptiste Riché feared Geffrard's popularity, and had him arrested to try to bring him to justice, but the court martial acquitted him for misconduct. In 1849, under the reign of Soulouque, Geffrard commanded an expedition against the Dominican Republic during which he was wounded at the Battle of Azua. He held the highest positions in the army under the government of Faustin Soulouque and under the Empire. In 1849 Soulouque become Emperor Faustin I and appointed Geffrard to command a division of the army during the first war against Santo Domingo (now the Dominican Republic), in which he gained fame by his victory at La Tabarra. During the second war against Santo Domingo (1856) General Geffrard distinguished himself on several occasions, in particular thanks to the skillful direction of the artillery in Banico. He was thus titled Duke of Tabarre for his military success. But as this regime became unpopular, Geffrard was threatened by Emperor Faustin I. Arrested, he escaped and organizes a revolt, which led to the fall of the Empire. On 15 January 1859, minutes after the abdication of Emperor Faustin I, he proclaimed the Third Republic and was elected president.

Presidency
His first act as president was to cut the army in half from 30,000 to 15,000.  He also formed his own presidential guards called Les Tirailleurs de la Garde, who were trained under him personally.  
In June 1859, Geffrard founded the National Law School and reinstituted the Medical School that Boyer began.  His ministers of Education, Jean Simon Elie-Dubois and François Elie-Dubois, modernized and established many lycea in Jacmel, Jérémie, Saint-Marc, and Gonaïves. On 10 October 1863, he reintroduced the colonial law that required roads to be built and maintained.  He also revived the policy of former rulers Jean-Jacques Dessalines, Alexandre Pétion and Jean-Pierre Boyer of recruiting African Americans to settle in Haiti. In May 1861, a group of African Americans led by James Theodore Holly settled east of Croix-des-Bouquets.  However, by 1862, Geffrard began to examine the constitution and eliminated the legislature to his own benefit.  He first gave himself a raise, 2 plantations, and paid for his personal luxuries with hospital funds and army funds. In 1863, he reformed the monetary system to that of the present day.

Geffrard was a Catholic, which made him renounce any form of the Voodoo faith.  He gave orders to demolish altars, drums, and any other instruments used in ceremonies. In 1863, a six-year-old girl was allegedly killed by Voodoo practitioners in a gruesome fashion.  Geffrard ordered a deep investigation and a public execution was held.  This case became the famous Affaire de Bizoton, which was featured in a British minister's best-selling book.

In 1859, Geffrard made the first attempt in negotiating with the Dominican Republic under the regime of Pedro Santana.  Unfortunately, in March 1861, Pedro gave his country back to Queen Isabella II of Spain, thus making Haitian officials nervous about having a European power back on their borders.  In May of that year, guerilla war broke out in Santo Domingo against Spain. Geffrard sent his personal guards and men to help out the rebels against Spanish troops, but in July 1861, following the execution of Francisco del Rosario Sánchez, Spain gave Haiti an ultimatum for participating and supporting the Dominican rebels.  In the end, Geffrard agreed to surrender to Spanish demands and dropped all intervention within Spanish territory in the east.  This episode left many Haitians humiliated and angry at Geffrard because he backed down to a European nation while Faustin Soulouque would have never accepted it.

Geffrard, like many Haitians, supported the abolitionist movement in the United States and held a state funeral for the abolitionist John Brown, who was hanged for leading an armed insurrection against the United States government in 1859. With the secession of the slave-owning Southern states in the American Civil War, Haiti was granted diplomatic recognition by the United States. During the war, Spanish and British colonial officials in Cuba, the Bahamas and neighboring Santo Domingo passively sided with the Confederacy, harboring Confederate commerce-raiders and blockade-runners. By contrast, Haiti was the one part of the Caribbean (with the exception of Danish St. Thomas) where the United States Navy was welcome, and Cap-Haïtien served as the headquarters of its West Indian Squadron, which helped maintain the Union blockade in the Florida Straits. Haiti also took advantage of the war to become a major exporter of cotton to the United States, and Geffrard imported gins and technicians to increase production. However, the crops failed in 1865 and 1866, and by that point the United States was again exporting cotton.

Failed coups against Geffrard

By the eighth month of Geffrard's presidency, Faustin Soulouque's minister of interior, Guerrier Prophète, began to lay out his plan to overthrow Geffrard.  Fortunately for Geffrard, his plan was picked up by Geffrard's guards and Prophète was exiled. In September 1859, Geffrard's daughter Madame Cora Manneville-Blanfort was assassinated by Timoleon Vanon. In 1861, General Legros tried to take over the weaponry storage but was detained by government forces. In 1862, Etienne Salomon tried to rally the rural community to revolt against Geffrard, but was instead shot and killed. In 1863, Aimé Legros gathered troops to overthrow Geffrard, but his troops betrayed him, and he was shot. In 1864, the elite community in Port-au-Prince tried to take over the weaponry storage, but the conspirators were later prosecuted and sentenced to jail.
In 1867, Geffrard's bodyguards, Tirailleurs, betrayed him and tried to assassinate him inside the national palace.

Overthrow
In 1865, Major Sylvain Salnave began his takeover of the North and Artibonite part of Haiti. By 15 May both Geffrard and his government troops clashed with Salnave Northern troops. After using the Royal Navy for gunboat diplomacy with Salnave, the Geffrard regime was in ruins, especially financially. He re-opened old wounds between North, West, and South Haitians and brought foreigners into domestic affairs.  In 1866, a huge fire engulfed hundreds of houses and businesses. In March 1867, Geffrard and his family disguised themselves and fled to Jamaica, where he died in Kingston in 1878.

Family
Geffrard, with his wife Marguerite Lorvana McIntosh, had several children: 
 Laurinska Madiou
 Celimene Cesvet
 Cora Manneville-Blandfort (d. 1859)
 Marguerite Zéïla Geffrard
 Claire Geffrard 
 Angèle Dupuy
 Charles Nicholas Clodomir Fabre Geffrard (1833-1859)

Footnotes

Presidents of Haiti
1806 births
1878 deaths
Haitian military leaders
Haitian people of Mulatto descent
Haitian exiles
Haitian emigrants to Jamaica
People from Nippes
Haitian Roman Catholics